Elías Sebastián López (born 8 July 2000) is an Argentine professional footballer who plays as a right-back for Godoy Cruz, on loan from River Plate.

Club career
López initially had short stints with the youth ranks of Argentinos Juniors and Racing Villa Mercedes, prior to joining River Plate's academy in 2010. He, nine years later, was promoted into their senior set-up at the beginning of 2019–20, making his professional debut in a 1–1 draw at the Estadio Diego Armando Maradona against Argentinos Juniors; picking up a yellow card as he played the full duration against his ex-club.

On 16 February 2021, López joined fellow league club Godoy Cruz on a one-year loan with a option to purchase 50% of his pass. In January 2022, the deal was extended for one further year.

International career
In 2017, López was called up by the Argentina U17s for the South American Championship in Chile. He appeared twice, in matches against Peru and Brazil. He had previously received a call-up for the U15s but didn't feature due to injury. In March 2019, López trained with the U20s.

Career statistics
.

References

External links

2000 births
Living people
People from Villa Mercedes, San Luis
Argentine footballers
Argentina youth international footballers
Association football defenders
Argentine Primera División players
Club Atlético River Plate footballers
Godoy Cruz Antonio Tomba footballers